South Korea competed at the 2016 Summer Paralympics in Rio de Janeiro, Brazil, from 7 to 18 September 2016.

Disability classifications

Every participant at the Paralympics has their disability grouped into one of five disability categories; amputation, the condition may be congenital or sustained through injury or illness; cerebral palsy; wheelchair athletes, there is often overlap between this and other categories; visual impairment, including blindness; Les autres, any physical disability that does not fall strictly under one of the other categories, for example dwarfism or multiple sclerosis. Each Paralympic sport then has its own classifications, dependent upon the specific physical demands of competition. Events are given a code, made of numbers and letters, describing the type of event and classification of the athletes competing. Some sports, such as athletics, divide athletes by both the category and severity of their disabilities, other sports, for example swimming, group competitors from different categories together, the only separation being based on the severity of the disability.

Medalists

Archery

South Korea qualified seven archers for the Rio Games following their performance at the 2015 World Archery Para Championships. This included two spots in the compound open, 1 for a man and 1 for a woman, four spots in the recurve open with 3 for men and 1 for a woman, and 1 spot for a woman in the W1 event.

Athletics

Boccia 

South Korea qualified for the 2016 Summer Paralympics in this sport at the Hong Kong hosted 2015 BISFed Asia and Oceania Boccia Team and Pairs Championships in the BC3 Pair event.  They claimed gold ahead of silver medalist Thailand and bronze medalists Singapore.  The pair team included Jeong Ho-won, Kim Han-soo, and Kim Jun-yup, and they were ranked second in the world at the time. They entered qualification as the number one seed in Asia in their event.

Cycling 

With one pathway for qualification being one highest ranked NPCs on the UCI Para-Cycling male and female Nations Ranking Lists on 31 December 2014, South Korea qualified for the 2016 Summer Paralympics in Rio, assuming they continued to meet all other eligibility requirements.

Judo

Powerlifting

Rowing

Shooting 

The first opportunity to qualify for shooting at the Rio Games took place at the 2014 IPC Shooting World Championships in Suhl. Shooters earned spots for their NPC.  South Korea earned a qualifying spot at this event in the R1 – 10m Air Rifle standing men SH1 event as a result of Seungchul Lee winning a silver medal. Teammate Jinho Park set an Asian record in the R1 – 10m Air Rifle standing men SH1 qualifying round. South Korea  qualified another shooter in the R7 – 50m rifle 3 positions Men SH1 event after Jinho Park won a bronze medal in this event. South Korea earned a spot in the P1 – 10m Air Pistol Men SH1 event after Heejung Lee won gold in the event.  Jinho Park qualified South Korea for the R3 – 10Mm Air Rifle Prone Mix SH1 event.

Swimming 

The top two finishers in each Rio medal event at the 2015 IPC Swimming World Championships earned a qualifying spot for their country for Rio. Giseong Jo earned South Korea a spot after winning gold in the Men's 200m Freestyle S4.

Table tennis

Wheelchair tennis 
South Korea qualified two competitors in the men's single event, Im Ho-won and Ha-Gel Lee.The slots came about via a Bipartite Commission Invitation place.  South Korea qualified one player in the women's singles event, Ju-Youn Park.

See also

South Korea at the Paralympics
South Korea at the 2016 Summer Olympics

References

Nations at the 2016 Summer Paralympics
2016
2016 in South Korean sport